Antonio Otero (born May 20, 1977) is a former American soccer player who played for D.C. United in the MLS.

Career statistics

Club

Notes

References

1977 births
Living people
American soccer players
Association football midfielders
D.C. United players
MLS Pro-40 players
Virginia Beach Mariners players
Miami Fusion players
Indiana Blast players
Major League Soccer players
USL Championship players